ANZUK was a tripartite force formed by Australia, New Zealand and the United Kingdom to defend the Asian Pacific region after the United Kingdom withdrew forces from the east of Suez in the early 1970s. The ANZUK force was formed in Singapore on 1 November 1971 under Rear Admiral David Wells and disbanded on 31 January 1974.

ANZUK order of battle
ANZUK initially consisted of the following major units:

ANZUK Force HQ
9 ANZUK Signal Regiment: Under command of the Royal Australian Corps of Signals, 9th (ANZUK) Signal Regiment task was to support the ANZUK Force, which in 1970 had replaced the British Forces Headquarters and Installations in Singapore. this joint service, multi national regiment took over, as going concerns, the Royal Navy Transmitter Stations at Suara, and the Royal Navy Receiver Station Kranji. The regiment employed New Zealand and British Army, Navy and Air Force Personnel together with locally enlisted Singaporean, British, New Zealand and Australian civilian technicians and communication specialists. In addition there was operational control of a group of Malaysian Navy communicators, which were to interface the force with the Malaysian Navy.
ANZUK Traffic Management Agency (ATMA)
ANZUK Intelligence and Security Unit
65 Ground Liaison Section
ANZUK Provost Unit

Naval component
Two RN frigates
RAN Frigate
RNZN Frigate
RN or RAN submarine

Land Component
The land component of ANZUK Force was the units of 28th Commonwealth Infantry Brigade Group renamed and relocated from Malaysia to Singapore.

28th ANZUK Brigade
Brigade Commanders of 28 ANZUK Brigade were:
 Brigadier Michael Walsh 1971–1972
 Brigadier Michael Kennedy 1972–1974

Units that constituted 28 ANZUK Brigade were:

 28 (ANZUK) Brigade HQ and Signal Squadron
6th Battalion, Royal Australian Regiment, Kangaw Barracks
1st Battalion Royal New Zealand Infantry Regiment, Dieppe Barracks
1st Battalion Royal Highland Fusiliers, Meerut Barracks
28th ANZUK Field Regiment,
Combined Australian/British HQ Battery
1st Battery Royal Artillery "The Blazers"
106th Field Battery, Royal Australian Artillery
161 Battery Royal New Zealand Artillery (1972 only)
28 ANZUK Field Squadron
28 ANZUK Aviation Squadron
182 Reconnaissance Flight AAAC (two  helicopters),
No. 656 Squadron AAC (one flight): Was the RE Air Troop, moved and rebadged from Jungle Warfare  School, Kota Tinggi, Johore

ANZUK Support Group

Transport Element
Commander Royal Australian Army Service Corps (CRAASC) and staff
ANZUK Base Transport Unit
Headquarters Base Transport Unit
Base Transport Platoon
Base Coach Platoon
Field Platoon
90 Transport Platoon, RAASC
402 Troop, RCT
BTU Workshops
ANZUK Supply Depot
ANZUK Postal and Courier Unit.

Ordnance Element
ANZUK Ordnance Depot: To support the Land Army component of the ANZUK Force, the ANZUK Ordnance Depot was established from the existing Australian/New Zealand 5 Advanced Ordnance Depot. Located in the premises vacated by the Royal Navy Victualling Depot on the dockside at Sembawang Naval Base. Ordnance support to ANZUK Force was based upon an integrated supply service manned by service personnel from the RAOC, RAAOC and RNZAOC with locally employed civilians (LEC) performing the basic clerical, warehousing and driving tasks. ANZUK Ordnance Depot was constituted of the following elements:
Stores Sub Depot
Vehicle Sub Depot
Ammunition Sub Depot
Barrack Services Unit

Workshop Element
ANZUK Area Workshops, Kangaw Barracks

Air Component
No. 3 Squadron RAAF – Dassault Mirage III
No. 41 Squadron RNZAF – Bristol Freighter and Bell UH-1H Iroquois
No. 75 Squadron RAAF – Dassault Mirage III
No. 103 Squadron RAF – Westland Whirlwind (later Westland Wessex) helicopters
No. 205 Squadron RAF –  Avro Shackleton

Dress distinctions 
Contributing nations wore their individual national uniforms with the addition of the following identifying patches;

Sea and Air components did not wear any of the patches as they remained under national command and were only attached to  NZUK command on an as required basis.

Disbandment
By 1973 the political climate in Australia and the United Kingdom had changed and it was deemed that ANZUK should be disbanded. Rear Admiral Wells, the First ANZUK commander who established the Force, had the task of planning the run-down phase and handing over to his successor Air Vice Marshal Richard Gordon Wakeford, to follow through.

Australia would be retaining a presence in Butterworth in Malaysia and the United Kingdom had decided to withdrawal all its forces east of Suez. It was in New Zealand's interest to retain a force in southeast Asia, so on 30 January 1974 New Zealand Force South East Asia was formed, taking under its command all the New Zealand units formerly part of ANZUK.

Over the course of 1974 the integrated units which made up the ANZUK were gradually disbanded and replaced by national units. On 31 January 1974 ceased to exist, followed on  16 December 1974 with the disbanding of the Naval and Air Headquarters and their assets reverted to their respective national command and what remained of the United Kingdom's land component forces became the 28th (UK) Infantry Brigade.

Taking several years for the Australian and United Kingdom units to draw down and withdraw, it was not until 1977 that NZFORSEA was the sole remaining foreign presence in Singapore.

See also
 ABCA Armies (the American, British, Canadian, Australian and New Zealand Armies' Program) optimises interoperability
 Five Power Defence Arrangements (signed in 1971) between Australia, Malaysia,  New Zealand, Singapore and the United Kingdom (all Commonwealth members)

References

External links
 To the Warrior his Arms A History of the RNZAOC and its predecessors
 ANZUK

20th-century military alliances
1970s in Australia
1970s in New Zealand
1970s in the United Kingdom
1971 in Australia
1971 in New Zealand
1971 in the United Kingdom
1974 in Australia
1974 in New Zealand
1974 in the United Kingdom
British Commonwealth units and formations
Military alliances involving Australia
Military alliances involving New Zealand
Military alliances involving the United Kingdom
Military units and formations of the New Zealand Army
Military units and formations established in 1971
Military units and formations disestablished in 1974
New Zealand
Singapore–United Kingdom military relations
Australia–Singapore relations
New Zealand–Singapore relations
Australia–United Kingdom relations
New Zealand–United Kingdom military relations